Hillary Bailey Smith (born May 25, 1957) is an American actress, best known for her daytime soap opera roles as Margo Hughes on As the World Turns and Nora Hanen Buchanan on One Life to Live.

Life and career
Smith was born as Hillary Bailey in Boston, Massachusetts. She attended Dana Hall School, Pine Manor College and Sarah Lawrence College. At Sarah Lawrence as a senior, she performed in off Broadway and Broadway productions, including The Heidi Chronicles. She married Philip Webster Smith, III in 1983. She met her husband at age 14 and married him a few years later after the two reconnected at a friend's wedding. They have two children, a daughter, Courtney and a son, Philip. (As an infant, Smith's son played her on-screen son briefly on As the World Turns.)

Smith is best known for her roles in the daytime soap operas. She made her soap debut in 1982, as Kit McCormick on The Doctors and one year later, taking over the role of Margo Hughes on As the World Turns, a role she played from 1983 to 1989.

After taking maternity leave from acting after the birth in 1988 of her son, Smith returned to daytime television, originating the role of Nora Hanen Buchanan on the ABC soap opera, One Life to Live. She played Nora from 1992 until the series' cancellation in 2012. She later returned to show in the 2013 The Online Network short-lived reboot. Smith won the Daytime Emmy Award for Outstanding Lead Actress in a Drama Series in 1994 for her performance in One Life to Live. From 1994 to 1995, Smith also has starred as lead in the NBC sitcom Something Wilder.

Smith appeared and produced web soap-type series Venice: The Series. As producer, in 2014 she has won Daytime Emmy. In 2014, Smith was the supervising producer for the soap opera web series Beacon Hill, and was nominated for a 2015 Daytime Emmy for Outstanding New Approaches Drama Series. In late January 2017, it was reported by Soap Opera Digest and Deadline Hollywood that Smith would reprise her role as Nora on General Hospital.

Filmography

Film

Television

Awards and nominations

References

External links

1957 births
Living people
20th-century American actresses
21st-century American actresses
Actresses from Massachusetts
American stage actresses
American television actresses
American soap opera actresses
Daytime Emmy Award winners
Daytime Emmy Award for Outstanding Lead Actress in a Drama Series winners
Pine Manor College alumni
Sarah Lawrence College alumni
Dana Hall School alumni